Pfarmers is an American experimental supergroup, made up of Danny Seim (Menomena, Lackthereof), Bryan Devendorf (The National), and Dave Nelson (Sufjan Stevens, St. Vincent).

Their debut album, Gunnera, was released in early 2015. A second studio album, Our Puram, was released the following year.

Discography
Gunnera (2015)
Our Puram (2016)

References

Supergroups (music)